Buckingham Hockey Club is a field hockey club based at Stowe School near Buckingham. The club also play fixtures at Akeley Wood School in Buckingham and Buckingham Town Cricket Club.

The Women's 1st Team play in the Investec Women's Hockey League Premier Division and the Men's team play in the South Hockey League (Middx, Berks, Bucks & Oxon - Division 3).

Players

Women's First Team Squad 2022-2023 season 

(captain)

Men's First Team Squad

Major Honours
 2015-16 Women's Cup Runner-Up

References

English field hockey clubs